Scena is a genus of moths in the subfamily Arctiinae. The genus was erected by Francis Walker in 1854.

Species
 Scena potentia Druce, 1894
 Scena propylea Druce, 1894

References

Euchromiina
Moth genera